Dorel Simion (born February 13, 1977 in București) is a Romanian boxer. Simion won the Welterweight bronze medal at the 2000 Summer Olympics. He also won gold at the 1997 World Championships and 1998 European Championships.

Personal
He is the younger brother of Olympian Marian Simion.

Amateur career
His Olympic results were:
Defeated Ruben Fuchu (Puerto Rico) RSCO 3
Defeated Roberto Guerra (Cuba) 11–7
Defeated Steven Kuchler (Germany) 26–14
Lost to Oleg Saitov (Russia) 19–10

External links
 

1977 births
Living people
Boxers at the 2000 Summer Olympics
Olympic boxers of Romania
Olympic bronze medalists for Romania
Olympic medalists in boxing
Romanian male boxers
AIBA World Boxing Championships medalists
Medalists at the 2000 Summer Olympics
Welterweight boxers
Romanian Romani people
Romani sportspeople